James Alexander Smith VC (5 January 1881 – 21 May 1968) was born in Workington, Cumberland and was an English recipient of the Victoria Cross, the highest and most prestigious award for gallantry in the face of the enemy that can be awarded to British and Commonwealth forces. His birth name was James Alexander Glenn.

He was 33 years old, and a private in the 3rd Battalion, Border Regiment, British Army, attached to  2nd Battalion  during the First World War. Smith and Abraham Acton from Whitehaven were both awarded their Victoria Cross for their actions on 21 December 1914 at Rouges Bancs, France.

On 21 December 1914 at Rouges Bancs, France, Smith and Abraham Acton, voluntarily went out from their trench and rescued a wounded man who had been lying exposed against the enemy's trenches for 15 hours. On the same day they again left their trench under heavy fire to bring in another wounded man. They were under fire for 60 minutes whilst conveying the wounded men to safety.

His Victoria Cross is displayed at the King's Own Royal Border Regiment and Border Regiment Museum, Carlisle Castle, Cumbria, England. He died 21 May 1968 in Middlesbrough, North Riding of Yorkshire, aged 87.

References

Monuments to Courage (David Harvey, 1999)
The Register of the Victoria Cross (This England, 1997)

External links 
 

1881 births
1968 deaths
Border Regiment soldiers
British Army personnel of World War I
British World War I recipients of the Victoria Cross
People from Workington
British Army recipients of the Victoria Cross